Scandal is a 1929 American drama film directed by Wesley Ruggles and written by Paul Schofield, Tom Reed and Walter Anthony. The film stars Laura La Plante, Huntley Gordon, John Boles, Jane Winton, Julia Swayne Gordon and Eddie Phillips. The film was released on April 27, 1929, by Universal Pictures.

Cast        
Laura La Plante as Laura Hunt
Huntley Gordon as Burke Innes
John Boles as Maurice
Jane Winton as Vera
Julia Swayne Gordon as Mrs. Grant
Eddie Phillips as Pancho
Judith Barrett as Janet

References

External links
 

1929 films
1920s English-language films
Silent American drama films
1929 drama films
Universal Pictures films
Films directed by Wesley Ruggles
American silent feature films
American black-and-white films
1920s American films